IYT may refer to:

Independent Youth Theatre
International Yacht Training Worldwide